Oksval is a village in Akershus, Norway. 

Villages in Akershus